Maheshwari Chauhan  (born 1996) is an Indian sport shooter who later went on to study at Lady Shri Ram College. She is the first Indian to win an individual medal in women’s skeet at an international event. She was trained under national coach Vikram Singh Chopra.

The 21-year-old secured the bronze on Day 5 at the ongoing 7th Asian Championship Shotgun in Astana, Kazakhstan to take India’s medal tally to a total of 6 in the championship. India’s tally now stands at two gold, one silver, and three bronze medals.

The young shooter also led her country to the team silver alongside compatriots Rashmmi Rathore and Saniya Sheikh. The triad of Indian eves shot a total of 190, narrowly losing out to gold medallists China, who shot 195. Hosts Kazakhstan secured the bronze with a score of 185

References 

Living people
1996 births
Indian female sport shooters
21st-century Indian women
21st-century Indian people